The Desert Sky League was established in 1999 as a high school athletic league, and is part of the CIF Southern Section. Members are located around central San Bernardino County, California.

Members
 Adelanto High School
 Barstow High School
 Granite Hills High School
 Silverado High School
 Victor Valley High School

References 

CIF Southern Section leagues